Prince Grégoire Bibesco-Bassaraba de Brancovan (12 December 1827 – 15 October 1886) was a Romanian-French prince.

Early life
Prince Grégoire was born in Craiova on 12 December 1827 and was a son of Romanian Prince Georges Bibesco (Gheorghe Bibescu) and Princess Zoé Bassaraba de Brancovan (Brâncoveanu).

Personal life

He married Rakoul (Rachel) Musurus (born ), the daughter of Pasha Constantine ('Costaki') Musurus (1807–1891) the Turkish ambassador to Britain, and his wife Anna Vogoridès. He was a relative of Romanian ambassador Prince Antoine Bibesco, husband of Elizabeth Lucy Asquith, who was the daughter of the Prime Minister of the United Kingdom H. H. Asquith. Prince Grégoire and his wife Rachel had three children:

 Prince Constantine Bibesco-Bassaraba de Brancovan (1875–1967)
 Princess Anna Elisabeth Bibesco-Bassaraba de Brancovan (1876–1933), who married Conste Mathieu Frederic Ferdinand garcal de Noailles in Paris On July 29, 1897. Anna Elizabeth was a contemporary of Marcel Proust and a prominent figure in Parisian society.
 Princess Catherine Hélène Bibesco-Bassaraba de Brancovan (1878–1929), who married Belgian Prince Alexandre de Caraman-Chimay (1873–1951), a son of Joseph de Caraman-Chimay, 18th Prince de Chimay and brother of Élisabeth, Countess Greffulhe and Joseph, Prince de Caraman-Chimay (married to American heiress Clara Ward). After Princess Hélène's death in 1929, Prince Alexandre married Mathilde Stuyvesant (widow of American millionaire Rutherfurd Stuyvesant).

Their home, Villa Bassaraba just west of Évian at Amphion-les-Bains, was a gathering place for music and poetry lovers, including Marcel Proust, Prince Edmond de Polignac, the Princess de Polignac (formerly Winnaretta Singer, a daughter of Singer sewing machine fortune founder Isaac Singer), Prince Antoine Bibesco, and the novelist Abel Hermant.

Prince Gregoire died in Paris on 15 October 1886.

Descendants
Through his daughter Hélène, he was a grandfather of Prince Marc-Adolphe de Caraman-Chimay (1903–1992).

References

External links
Ralouka ('Rachel') Bibesco-Bassaraba (née Musurus), Princess de Brancovan at the National Portrait Gallery, London

19th-century Romanian people
1827 births
1886 deaths
Wallachian nobility